Ricardo "Rocky" Juárez (born April 15, 1980) is an American former professional boxer. He is a former WBC Silver featherweight champion and a multiple-time world title challenger. Juarez was known over his career for his aggressive fighting style and incredible durability; in 11 defeats he was never stopped.

Amateur career 
Juarez had a lustrous amateur career with a 145–17 record, which included a 68 fight winning streak, a Featherweight Olympic silver medal and a Junior Olympic World and National gold medal. In 1999 he won the world title at the 1999 World Amateur Boxing Championships in his home town. During the 2000 Olympics Gold medal round, Juarez loss controversially against Bekzat Sattarkhanov who was warned several times for holding and not penalized. It should be also noted that by the end of the second round Juarez was losing 11 points and had only 4 points to lose the match by RSC. Juarez accepted the silver medal.

1998 United States Amateur Featherweight champion. Results were:
Undepited Daniel Chavez points
Defeated Darling Jimenez points
Defeated Aaron Torres points
Defeated Hong Gu points
1999 United States Amateur Featherweight champion. Results were:
Defeated Jose Santa Cruz points
Defeated Francisco Valentin TKO 3
Defeated Ray Martinez points
Defeated Aaron Torres points
Defeated Steve Luevano points
2000 United States Amateur Featherweight champion
Member of the 2000 U.S. Olympic team as a Featherweight, winning a silver medal. Results were:
Defeated Bijan Batmani (Iran) RSC-3
Defeated Falk Huste (Germany) points
Defeated Somluck Kamsing (Thailand) RSC-4
Defeated Kamil Dzamalutdinov (Russia) points
Lost to Bekzat Sattarkhanov (Kazakhstan) points

Professional career 
Juarez turned pro on January 25, 2001 with a unanimous decision against Pascali Adorno. A highly touted prospect, Juarez rose up the ranks with wins against Hector Velazquez, and Joe Morales. Juarez's 10th-round knockout of Antonio Diaz was named Ring Magazine Knockout of the Year for 2003. His first challenge came from 1996 Olympian Zahir Raheem on July 17, 2004, in which he won by controversial decision, possibly due to the fight taking place at Juarez's hometown in Houston, Texas. Juarez's first career loss came to Humberto Soto, who was a late sub replacement to In Jin Chi. Soto won the Interim version of the WBC featherweight title.  Juarez bounced back with back-to-back wins against Reynaldo Hurtado and Backlin Medrano and earned a shot against Mexican legend, Marco Antonio Barrera for his WBC Super featherweight title.

Juarez fought Barrera on May 20, 2006 in the Staples Center in Los Angeles, California. Barrera used his jab to win the early rounds, but it was obvious from the start that Juarez wasn't backing down hurting Barrera's nose in the process.  During the second half of the fight Juarez took control by rocking Barrera and making him spit out his mouthpiece several times. In a very close fight, the bout was announced originally as a draw, but later it was revealed that two of the judges scorecards had an error, as Barrera was granted the win by split decision. Despite losing, Juarez gained notoriety by standing toe to toe with one of the best pound-for-pound boxers in the world. Although not required by contract, Barrera and Juarez met in a rematch on September 16, this time Barrera winning comfortably on points through a unanimous decision (117-111, 115–113, 115-113).

As a replacement for Jorge Rodrigo Barrios, Rocky Juarez stepped in and fought Juan Manuel Márquez for the WBC Super Featherweight title on November 3, 2007. He lost to Marquez on a unanimous decision. Juarez fought most of the fight with a bad cut above his left eye due to an accidental headbutt in the first round.

On September 6, 2008, Rocky Juarez, (27-4, 19 KO's) won by TKO at 2:55 in the 11th round of the 12-rounder over former WBO Junior Lightweight Champion Jorge Rodrigo Barrios, (47-3-1, 34 KO's).

In his fourth attempt at a title, Juarez fought Chris John to a controversial draw on February 28, 2009 in his hometown of Houston. Most ringside observers thought John won. The two were supposed to fight a rematch on June 27 of that year but John withdrew from the fight due to problems with his blood tests. The rematch finally took place on September 19 and the fight was won by John.

Rocky Juarez fought Jason Litzau on April 3, 2010, losing by a controversial technical decision when the fight was halted in the seventh round due to a cut on Litzau's cheek which referee Jay Nady ruled was caused by an accidental head butt. The judges scored it 68-65 and 67-66 twice, in favour of the winner, Jason Litzau.

Professional Boxing Record

| style="text-align:center;" colspan="8"|29 Wins (21 knockouts, 8 decisions), 9 Losses, 1 Draw (s), 0 No Contests
|-
|align=center style="border-style: none none solid solid; background: #e3e3e3"|Result
|align=center style="border-style: none none solid solid; background: #e3e3e3"|Record
|align=center style="border-style: none none solid solid; background: #e3e3e3"|Opponent
|align=center style="border-style: none none solid solid; background: #e3e3e3"|Type
|align=center style="border-style: none none solid solid; background: #e3e3e3"|Round
|align=center style="border-style: none none solid solid; background: #e3e3e3"|Date
|align=center style="border-style: none none solid solid; background: #e3e3e3"|Location
|align=center style="border-style: none none solid solid; background: #e3e3e3"|Notes
|-align=center
|Win
|29-9-1
|align=left| Antonio Escalante
|TKO
|8 
|
|align=left|
|align=left|
|-align=center
|Loss
|28-9-1
|align=left| Andrew Cancio
|UD
|10
|
|align=left|
|align=left|
|-align=center
|Loss
|28-9-1
|align=left| Vicente Escobedo
|UD
|10
|
|align=left|
|align=left|
|-align=center
|Loss
|28-8-1
|align=left| Alejandro Sanabria
|UD
|12
|
|align=left|
|align=left|
|-align=center
|Loss
|28-7-1
|align=left| Jorge Linares
|UD
|12
|
|align=left|
|align=left|
|-align=center
|Loss
|28-6-1
|align=left| Jason Litzau
|TD
|7 
|
|align=left|
|align=left|
|-align=center
|Loss
|28-5-1
|align=left| Chris John
|UD
|12
|
|align=left|
|align=left|
|-align=center
|style="background:#abcdef;"|Draw 
|28-4-1
|align=left| Chris John
|D
|12
|
|align=left|
|align=left|
|-align=center
|Win
|28-4
|align=left| Jorge Barrios
|TKO
|11 , 2:55
|
|align=left|
|align=left|
|-align=center
|Loss
|27-4
|align=left| Juan Manuel Marquez
|UD
|12
|
|align=left|
|align=left|
|-align=center

References

External links
 

American boxers of Mexican descent
Olympic boxers of the United States
Boxers at the 2000 Summer Olympics
Living people
1980 births
American male boxers
AIBA World Boxing Championships medalists
Medalists at the 2000 Summer Olympics
Olympic silver medalists for the United States in boxing
Featherweight boxers